The Nahuelbuta Range or Cordillera de Nahuelbuta is a mountain range in Bio-Bio and Araucania Region, southern Chile. It is located along the Pacific coast and forms part of the larger Chilean Coast Range. The name of the range derives from the Mapudungun words nahuel (jaguar)  and futa (big)

Historically Cordillera de Nahuelbuta and its surrounding valleys were the foci of the Arauco War. The Spanish designs for this region was to exploit the placer deposits of gold around the range using unfree Mapuche labour from the densely populated valleys. For this purpose the Spanish established a series of settlements and fortified houses around Cordillera de Nahuelbuta.

See also
Arauco Basin
Coastal Batholith of central Chile
Nahuelbuta National Park
Valdivian Coastal Range

References

Mountain ranges of Chile
Chilean Coast Range
Landforms of Araucanía Region
Landforms of Biobío Region